Tim Madison (better known as Vadge Moore) is an American musician, best known as the drummer of punk band Dwarves. He formed Chthonic Force, a noise/industrial band based that was based in Atlanta, Georgia. In 2009, he released his first book, Chthonic: Prose & Theory.
In 2015, he released a second book, Malevolence. In 2022, a third, My Life with the Dwarves, a retrospect on his time as a member of the Dwarves.

Discography

The Dwarves 

 Blood Guts & Pussy LP (Sub Pop, 1990, SP 67)
 Thank Heaven for Little Girls LP (Sub Pop, 1991, SP 126)
 Sugarfix LP (Sub Pop, 1993, SP 197)
 The Dwarves Are Young and Good Looking LP (Theologian Records, 1997, T53)
 Free Cocaine DLP (Recess Records, 1999, RECESS No. 51) (early singles collection)
 Lick It DLP (Recess Records, 1999, RECESS No. 52)
 The Dwarves Come Clean LP (Epitaph Records, 2000, 86575 1)

Neither/Neither World 

 Dismember Them (Majestic Chaos) 7" (1992)
 Sociopathic Pleasures (Funky Mushroom) CD/LP (1992)
 Tales of the True Crime (Alive) CD (1994)
 Maddening Montagery (Dark Vinyl) CD/VHS (1995)
 Enter the Abyss (SSE Communications) CD (1996)
 Torch Songs (Best Of) (World Serpent) CD (1998)
 Suicide Notes (Zos Kia Sounds) CD (2000)
 She Whispers (Peoples Records) CD (2003)

Phoenix Thunderstone 

 Hour of the Wolf 7" (1997)
 Picnic with the Dead (Heyday) CD (1998)
 Phoenix Thunderstone (Heyday) CD (1999)
 Hairy Carrie / Secret (Reptilian) 7" (1999)
 Under The Covers (Transparent) 7" (2000)

Chthonic Force 

 Mouth Pigs (Zos Kia Sounds) 7" (1999)
 Chthonic Force (Zos Kia Sounds / World Serpent) CD (1999)
 Agathodaemon (HauRuck!) LP (2001)
 delirium tremens: THE BEST OF CHTHONIC FORCE (Discriminate Audio) CD (2007)

Other 

 Blag Dahlia – Venus with Arms (1995, Altavistic)
 The Dwarves – The Dwarves Are Born Again (2011, MVD Audio)
 Bubblebath in Blood – Anarchist Superstar EP (2012, Shat @ The Devil)

References

External links 
Official website

1967 births
Living people
American punk rock drummers
American male drummers
American rock drummers
20th-century American drummers
Dwarves (band) members
20th-century American male musicians